Qatar competed at the 2013 World Championships in Athletics in Moscow, Russia, from 10–18 August 2013. A team of five athletes was announced to represent the country in the event.

Medalists
The following competitors from Qatar won medals at the Championships

Results

Men

References

External links
IAAF World Championships – Qatar

Nations at the 2013 World Championships in Athletics
World Championships in Athletics
Qatar at the World Championships in Athletics